Renmark is a town in South Australia's rural Riverland area, and is located  northeast of Adelaide, on the banks of the River Murray. The Sturt Highway between Adelaide and Sydney runs through the town; Renmark is the last major town encountered in South Australia when driving this route. It is a few kilometres west of the SA-Victoria and SA-NSW borders.

History
 

 
It has been suggested that the name Renmark refers to a local Aboriginal word meaning "red mud" (the original inhabitants of the area were the Erawirung people). However, the mud at Renmark is not red. Another possibility is the name of an early settler in the district, William Renny. The first unambiguous use of the name (as "Renmark Flat") in newspapers was in October 1888.

Captain Charles Sturt was the first European to pass through the area in January 1830, as he navigated the length of the Murray River from the Great Dividing Range, eventually reaching Lake Alexandrina.

A settlement began to grow in 1887, when the Renmark Irrigation Settlement was established by George and William Chaffey, who created a system of open drains using water from the Murray River, (called Renmark Irrigation Trust) to allow orchards to be planted in the area. By pumping water onto the hot red sand they transformed it into a fruit growing area similar to California. The Chaffey brothers' business collapsed in 1893, and the Renmark Irrigation Trust was created to manage the irrigation scheme.

Renmark was proclaimed a town in 1904 and a municipality in 1935.

Bush poet and soldier Breaker Morant worked locally, at J. F. Cudmore's Paringa Station in the 1890s, before serving in the Boer War.

The Renmark Hotel was the first community-owned hotel in the British Empire and became the town's major landmark.

Renmark was connected to Adelaide by rail on 31 January 1927, when the railway line across the bridge to Paringa was opened. It was later extended west as far as Barmera, and known as the Barmera railway line, but then closed in 1983 then the last scheduled train to cross the bridge was on 31 December 1990.

Heritage listings

Renmark has a number of heritage-listed sites, including:

 Murray Avenue: Renmark Hotel
 149 Murray Avenue: Renmark Irrigation Trust Office
 24 Ral Ral Avenue: Renmark Post Office
 Renmark Avenue: Renmark Distillery Bridge
 Renmark Avenue: Olivewood
 Sturt Highway: Paringa Bridge

Governance
Renmark is located within the federal division of Barker, the state electoral district of Chaffey and the local government area of the Renmark Paringa Council.

Tourism, industry and facilities
Renmark is a multicultural centre for the Riverland area. The river itself offers excellent spots for fishing, waterskiing and boating. The area is known for the cultivation of grapes, citrus fruits, tomatoes, vegetables, wheat and wool. Orange trees stretch for hectares as do vineyards and stone fruit orchards. Other industries include almond growing and pistachio nut cultivation.

Renmark is also home to the region's only restored paddle steamer, wine companies and the rose industry. Renmark hosts the Renmark Rose Festival every October.

There is a shopping centre known as Renmark Square, camping grounds, and a  dirt oval speedway known as the Riverland Speedway.

Murray River National Park

The Murray River National Park includes two locations near Renmark:
 Paringa Paddock, including Goat Island, between Renmark and Paringa; and
 Bulyong, or Bulyong Island, on the west side of the river upstream from Renmark, accessible only by boat.

Paringa Paddock (which includes Goat Island) contains areas of riverine woodlands, wetlands and river flats. The floodplain is lined by huge river red gum (Eucalyptus camaldulensis) and river box (Eucalyptus largiflorens).  The wetland complex provides habitat for koalas, birds and reptiles, and the park provides recreation for people of all ages and abilities. There are walking and biking trails developed by the Renmark Paringa Council and the local community. Bulyong is home to many wildlife species, such as western grey kangaroos, emus, pelicans, kingfishers and parrots.

Media
The Murray Pioneer, a newspaper founded in 1892 as the Renmark Pioneer, is printed in Renmark.

Channels from the following television networks are available in Renmark:
 ABC Television (ABC)
 SBS Television (SBS) 
 WIN Television (7, 9 & 10) as RTS-5A & LRS-34 relays the programming from Seven Network (Seven SA), Nine Network (Nine SA) & Network Ten (Ten SA), Sky News Regional and Fox Sports News, with local commercials inserted

The Australian Broadcasting Corporation (ABC) broadcasts a local radio station, ABC Riverland (1062 AM), along with national stations ABC Radio National (1305 AM); ABC News Radio (93.9 FM); ABC Classic (105.1 FM) and Triple J (101.9 FM).

In addition, there are commercial radio stations, including 5RM (801 AM); Wild Country Radio (1557 AM); Magic FM (93.1 FM); TAB Racing Network (95.5 FM) and Riverland Life (100.7 FM).

Sporting teams
 Renmark Olympic (football)
 Renmark Rovers (australian rules)
 Renmark Royals (cricket)

Notable people
Thomas Angove, a winemaker from Renmark, invented the process for packaging cask (box) wine, patented by his company on 20 April 1965.
Gordon Bilney – politician
Rob Bredl – documentary film maker
Rick Burr – former Chief of Army
John Cock (RAF officer) – flying ace of the Second World War
Syd Heylen – performer
Rex Hobcroft – musician
Ruby Hunter, Aboriginal singer-songwriter and partner of Archie Roach, was born in 1955 on Goat Island.
John Percival Jennings – horticulturist
Cecil Madigan – explorer and geologist
Mark Mickan – AFL footballer
Patricia Mickan – basketballer
Anne Ruston – politician
Nicole Seekamp – basketballer
Dean Semler – cinematographer
Ross Story – politician
Jack Wade – AFL footballer

Climate
Renmark experiences a cool arid climate, bordering on a cool semi-arid climate with hot, dry summers (though which are subject to cold fronts on account of the western longitude); warm to mild springs and autumns; and cool, sometimes cloudy winters. Renmark is surrounded by mallee scrub, and is situated in a grassland location, north of Goyder's Line.

Due to its geographical location, it summers are a few degrees hotter than Adelaide's temperatures, although it has many more touches of frost in winter, and it also lacks Adelaide's sizeable winter precipitation.

See also
 1956 Murray River flood
 River Murray Crossings

References

External links

Town map (2011), showing Renmark, Paringa and Paringa Paddock, with Goat Island
 The Age travel guide – Renmark (2004)

Towns in South Australia
Populated places on the Murray River
Riverland